Roy Paul Harvey (September 10, 1882 – December 5, 1955) was a prolific American character actor who appeared in at least 177 films.

Biography
Primarily a character actor, Harvey began his career on stage and in silent films. He appeared in the Broadway and original film versions of The Awful Truth, then had supporting roles in many Hollywood films, often portraying dignified executives or pompous authority figures.

He was a vacationing businessman whose car is commandeered by fugitive killer Humphrey Bogart in the 1936 crime drama The Petrified Forest and the minister who marries Spencer Tracy's daughter Elizabeth Taylor in the 1950 comedy Father of the Bride and baptizes her baby in its sequel. In the thriller Side Street, Harvey played a married man forced to pay $30,000 in blackmail money after having an affair.

Besides his numerous films, Harvey appeared in 1950s television series such as I Love Lucy, December Bride, My Little Margie,  Father Knows Best and  The George Burns and Gracie Allen Show  before his death from a coronary thrombosis in 1955.

Selected filmography

 The Pearl of the Antilles (1915) as Col. Henry Richmond
 Men Who Have Made Love to Me (1918) as The Literary Man
 The Awful Truth (1929) as Dan Leeson
 The Wiser Sex (1932) (with Claudette Colbert and Melvyn Douglas) as Blaney
 Advice to the Lovelorn (1933) as Gaskell
 The House of Rothschild (1934) (with Boris Karloff and Loretta Young) as Solomon Rothschild
 Looking for Trouble (1934) (with Spencer Tracy) as James Regan
 The Last Gentleman (1934) as One of Judd's Creditors (uncredited)
 Born to Be Bad (1934) (with Loretta Young and Cary Grant) as Attorney Brian
 Charlie Chan's Courage (1934) as J.P. Madden / Jerry Delaney
 Hat, Coat, and Glove (1934) as The Prosecuting Attorney
 Handy Andy (1934) (with Will Rogers) as Charlie Norcross
 She Was a Lady (1934) as Jeff Dyer
 The Affairs of Cellini (1934) as Emissary
 Kid Millions (1934) (with Eddie Cantor and Ann Sothern) as Shiek Mulhulla
 The President Vanishes (1934) as Skinner
 Broadway Bill (1934) as James Whitehall
 A Wicked Woman (1934) as Ed Trice
 The Whole Town's Talking (1935) (with Edward G. Robinson) as 'J.G.' Carpenter
 I'll Love You Always (1935) as Sandstone
 Four Hours to Kill! (1935) as Capt. Seaver
 Goin' to Town (1935) (with Mae West) as Donovan
 Alibi Ike (1935) (with Joe E. Brown and Olivia de Havilland) as Lefty Crawford
 Broadway Melody of 1936 (1935) (with Jack Benny) as Scully, Managing Editor
 Thanks a Million (1935) (with Dick Powell and Ann Dvorak) as Maxwell
 Rose of the Rancho (1936) as Boss Martin
 The Petrified Forest (1936) (with Humphrey Bogart and Bette Davis) as Mr. Chisholm
 August Weekend (1936) as George Washburne
 The Walking Dead (1936) (with Boris Karloff) as Blackstone
 The Witness Chair (1936) as Prosecuting Attorney Martin
 Private Number (1936) (with Loretta Young, Robert Taylor and Basil Rathbone) as Perry Winfield
 The Return of Sophie Lang (1936) as Insp. Parr
 Postal Inspector (1936) as Police Lt. Ordway (uncredited)
 Yellowstone (1936) as Chief Ranger Radell
 The General Died at Dawn (1936) as American Husband (uncredited)
 Mad Holiday (1936) as Chief Gibbs (uncredited)
 The Plainsman (1936) as Yellow Hand
 Three Men on a Horse (1936) as Clarence Dobbins
 Mind Your Own Business (1936) as Brannigan
 Black Legion (1937) (with Humphrey Bogart) as Billings
 23 1/2 Hours Leave (1937) as Gen. Markley
 The Soldier and the Lady (1937) as Tsar
 The Devil Is Driving (1937) as Sam Mitchell
 On Again-Off Again (1937) as Mr. Applegate
 Big City (1937) as District Attorney Gilbert
 My Dear Miss Aldrich (1937) as Mr. Sinclair
 High Flyers (1937) (with Bert Wheeler, Robert Woolsey, and Lupe Vélez) as Horace Arlington
 Algiers (1938) as Janvier
 A Slight Case of Murder (1938) as Mr. Whitewood
 Love on a Budget (1938) as Emory Fisher
 Rebecca of Sunnybrook Farm (1938) as Cyrus Bartlett
 The Higgins Family (1938) as Ollie Thornwald
 I'll Give a Million (1938) as Corcoran
 If I Were King (1938) as Burgundian Herald
 The Sisters (1938) as Caleb Ammon
 There's That Woman Again (1938) as Stone
 Charlie Chan in Honolulu (1938)  as Inspector Rawlins
 Mr. Moto in Danger Island (1939) as Gov. John Bentley
 Never Say Die (1939) as Jasper Hawkins
 The Gorilla (1939) as A.P. Conway
 The Forgotten Woman (1939) as Charles Courtenay
 News Is Made at Night (1939) as Inspector Melrose
 They Shall Have Music (1939) as Heifetz' Manager
 Stanley and Livingstone (1939) (with Spencer Tracy and Nancy Kelly) as Colonel Grimes
 Meet Dr. Christian (1939) as John Hewitt
 Two Thoroughbreds (1939) as Horse Owner
 Brother Rat and a Baby (1940) as Sterling Randolph
 High School (1940) as James Wallace
 Dr. Ehrlich's Magic Bullet (1940) as Defense Attorney (uncredited)
 The Marines Fly High (1940) as Col. Hill
 Typhoon (1940) as Dea's father
 Sailor's Lady (1940) as Captain
 Maryland (1940) as Buckman
 Manhattan Heartbeat (1940) as Dr. Bentley
 Arizona (1940) (with William Holden and Jean Arthur) as Solomon Warner
 Behind the News (1940) (with Lloyd Nolan) as Dist. Atty. Hardin S. Kelly
 High Sierra (1941) (with Humphrey Bogart and Ida Lupino) as Mr. Baughman
 Ride on Vaquero (1941) as Colonel Warren
 Out of the Fog (1941) as Judge Moriarty
 Puddin' Head (1941) as Mr. Harvey
 Law of the Tropics (1941) as Alfred King, Sr.
 Great Guns (1941) as Gen. Taylor
 You Belong to Me (1941) as Barrows
 Three Girls About Town (1941) as Fred Chambers
 Rise and Shine (1941) as Orville Turner
 Mr. District Attorney in the Carter Case (1941) as Dist. Atty. Winton
 You're in the Army Now (1941) as General Philpot
 Remember the Day (1941) as Sen. Phillips
 A Tragedy at Midnight (1942) as Landeck
 Blondie's Blessed Event (1942) as William Lawrence (uncredited)
 The Man Who Wouldn't Die (1942) as Dudley Wolff
 Moonlight Masquerade (1942) as John Bennett Sr.
 You Can't Escape Forever (1942) as Maj. Turner
 Heart of the Golden West (1942) as James Barrabee
 Thank Your Lucky Stars (1943) as Dr. Kirby (uncredited)
 The Man from Music Mountain (1943) as Arthur Davis
 Mystery Broadcast (1943) as Arthur J. Stanley
 Four Jills in a Jeep (1944) as General (uncredited)
 Henry Aldrich Plays Cupid (1944) as Senator Tom Caldicott
 Jamboree (1944) as P.J. Jarvis
 In the Meantime, Darling (1944) as Maj. Gen. B.R. Garnett (uncredited)
 Thoroughbreds (1944) as John Crandall
 The Horn Blows at Midnight (1945) as Hotel Manager Thompson
 Pillow to Post (1945) as J.R. Howard, Coast Oil Well Supply (uncredited)
 The Chicago Kid (1945) as Carter
 Midnight Manhunt (1945) as Mr. McAndrews, Night Editor (uncredited)
 The Southerner (1945) as Ruston
 Mama Loves Papa (1945) as Mr. McIntosh
 State Fair (1945) as Simpson (uncredited)
 Swingin' on a Rainbow (1945) as Thomas Marsden
 Don't Fence Me In (1945) as Gov. Thomas
 Spellbound (1945) (with Ingrid Bergman and Gregory Peck) as Dr. Hanish
 Up Goes Maisie (1946) (with Ann Sothern) as Mr. J.G. Nuboult
 Gay Blades (1946) as J.M. Snively
 Blondie's Lucky Day (1946) as Jonathan Butler, Sr.
 They Made Me a Killer (1946) as District Attorney Booth
 A Night in Casablanca (1946) (with the Marx Brothers) as Mr. Smythe
 Do You Love Me (1946) as Artemis Hilliard (scenes deleted)
 In Fast Company (1946) as Patrick McCormick
 Easy to Wed (1946) as Curtis Farwood
 The Bamboo Blonde (1946) as Patrick Ransom, Sr.
 Shadow of a Woman (1946) as Howard K. Brooks, Chief of Detectives (uncredited)
 Heldorado (1946) as C.W. Driscoll
 That Brennan Girl (1946) as Judge (uncredited)
 The Beginning or the End (1947) as Lieut. General W. D. Styer
 The Late George Apley (1947) as Julian H. Dole (uncredited)
 Danger Street (1947) as Turlock
 Out of the Blue (1947) as Mr. Holliston
 High Barbaree (1947) as John Case
 Living in a Big Way (1947) as Judge (uncredited)
 Wyoming (1947) as Judge Sheridan
 When a Girl's Beautiful (1947) as Stafford Shayne
 The Judge Steps Out (1948) as John Struthers II (uncredited)
 Call Northside 777 (1948) (with James Stewart) as Martin Burns
 Lightnin' in the Forest (1948) as Judge Waterman
 Speed to Spare (1948) as Al Simmons
 Blondie's Reward (1948) as John D. Dickson
 Give My Regards to Broadway (1948) as Mr. Boyd (uncredited)
 Waterfront at Midnight (1948) as Commissioner Ryan
 The Babe Ruth Story (1948) as Bagley (scenes deleted)
 A Southern Yankee (1948) as Plaza Hotel Manager (uncredited)
 Smugglers' Cove (1948) as Terrence Mahoney Esq.
 Family Honeymoon (1948) as Chancellor Fenster
 John Loves Mary (1949) as Gen. Biddle
 Down to the Sea in Ships  (1949) (with Richard Widmark and Lionel Barrymore) as Capt. John Briggs
 Duke of Chicago (1949) as Chester Cunningham
 Make Believe Ballroom (1949) as George Wilcox (uncredited)
 Mr. Belvedere Goes to College (1949) (with Clifton Webb) as Dr. Keating
 Take One False Step (1949) as Mr. Arnspiger
 The Fountainhead (1949) (with Gary Cooper and Patricia Neal) as Opera Businessman (uncredited)
 The Girl from Jones Beach (1949) as Jim Townsend
 Special Agent (1949) as Mr. Travis - Rancher (uncredited)
 Unmasked (1950) as Harry Jackson
 When Willie Comes Marching Home (1950) as Brig. Gen. Lamson (uncredited)
 Side Street (1950) as Emil Lorrison
 The Yellow Cab Man (1950) as Pearson Hendricks
 Riding High (1950) as Whitehall
 A Ticket to Tomahawk (1950) as Mr. Bishop (uncredited)
 Father of the Bride (1950) (with Spencer Tracy and Elizabeth Taylor) as Reverend Galsworthy
 The Lawless (1950) as Chief of Police Blake
 The Skipper Surprised His Wife (1950) as Brendon Boyd
 Three Little Words (1950) as Al Masters
 Stella (1950) as Ralph Denny (uncredited)
 The Milkman (1950) (with Donald O'Connor and Jimmy Durante) as D.A. Abbott
 The Flying Missile (1950) as Gen. Benton, USA
 Up Front (1951) as Col. Akeley
 Father's Little Dividend (1951) (with Spencer Tracy and Elizabeth Taylor) as Rev. Galsworthy
 Thunder in God's Country (1951) as Carson Masterson
 The Great Caruso (1951) as Opera Benefit Master of Ceremonies (uncredited)
 Excuse My Dust (1951) as Cyrus Random, Sr.
 Let's Go Navy! (1951) as Lt. Cmdr. O. Tannen
 The Tall Target (1951) as Minor Role (uncredited)
 Here Come the Nelsons (1952) (with Ozzie and Harriet and Rock Hudson) as Samuel T. Jones
 The First Time (1952) as Leeming
 Skirts Ahoy! (1952) as Old Naval Officer in Theatre (uncredited)
 Has Anybody Seen My Gal? (1952) as Judge Wilkins
 Dreamboat (1952) (with Clifton Webb and Ginger Rogers) as Lawyer D.W. Harrington
 April in Paris (1952) (with Doris Day and Ray Bolger) as Secretary Robert Sherman
 The Girl Who Had Everything (1953) as Senator Drummond (uncredited)
 Remains to Be Seen (1953) as Mr. Bennett
 Here Come the Girls (1953) as Mr. Newbold (uncredited)
 Calamity Jane (1953) (with Doris Day) as Henry Miller
 Sabrina (1954) as Dr. Calaway (uncredited)
 Three for the Show (1955) as Col. Harold J. Wharton (uncredited)
 High Society (1955) (with Leo Gorcey and Huntz Hall) as Henry Baldwin
 The Ten Commandments (1956) as Royal Physician (uncredited)

References

External links 

 
 
 gf

1882 births
1955 deaths
Male actors from Illinois
American male stage actors
American male film actors
20th-century American male actors
People from Sandwich, Illinois
Deaths from coronary thrombosis